William Green may refer to

Arts and entertainment
William Green (action painter) (1934–2001), British artist
William Green (painter) (1760–1823), British artist
William Green (piper) (1775–1860), Northumbrian piper
William Curtis Green (1875–1960), English architect
William Clark Green (born 1986), American country music singer
William Ellis Green (1923–2008), Australian cartoonist

Military
Sir William Green, 1st Baronet (1725–1811), British army officer
William Green (British Army soldier) (1784–1881), English veteran of the Napoleonic wars
William Green (British Army officer, born 1882) (1882–1947), British Army major-general
William Edward Green (1898–1940), British World War I flying ace
William Henry Rodes Green (1823–1912), British Indian Army general
Sir William Wyndham Green (1887–1979), British Army general

Politics and law

U.K.
William Green (fl.1406), MP for Lewes
William Green (died 1555), MP for Downton
William Green (MP for Poole) (fl. 1563–1572), MP for Poole
William Lowthian Green (1819–1890), English merchant and cabinet minister in the Kingdom of Hawaii

U.S.
William Green (lawyer) (1806–1880), Virginia lawyer, son of John W. Green
William Comstock Green (1802–1874), American politician
William J. Green Jr. (1910–1963), U.S. Representative from Pennsylvania
William J. Green III (born 1938), American politician, mayor of Philadelphia and U.S. Representative from Pennsylvania
Bill Green IV (William J. Green, IV, born 1965), American politician in Philadelphia
William R. Green (1856–1947), U.S. Representative from Iowa
William R. Green Jr. (c. 1889–1966), United States Tax Court judge
William T. Green (1860–1911), African-American attorney and civil rights activist
S. William Green (1929–2002), U.S. congressman from New York

Elsewhere
William Green (Australian politician) (1878–1968), member of the Queensland Legislative Assembly

Sports

Cricket
William Green (cricketer, born 1817) (1817–1870), English batsman playing for Kent
William Green (cricketer, born 1834) (1834–1876), English batsman playing for Kent
William Green (cricketer, born 1852) (1852–1924), English cricketer for Marylebone Cricket Club

Other sports
William Green (American football) (born 1979), American football player
William Green (baseball) (1894–1925), American Negro leagues third baseman
William Green (footballer) (1881–1966), Welsh footballer
Will Green (rugby union) (born 1973), English rugby union footballer
Willie Green (born 1981), American basketball player
Willie Green (American football) (born 1966), American football player

Science and medicine
William Green (author) (1927–2010), British aviation author
William H. Green (born 1963), American chemical engineer
William Spotswood Green (1847–1919), Irish naturalist

Others
William Green (former slave) (c.1814–1895), African-American escaped slave and writer
William Green (U.S. labor leader) (1873–1952), president of the American Federation of Labor
William D. Green (born 1953), American businessman, chairman of Accenture
William Henry Green (1824–1900), American Hebrew scholar
William Mercer Green (1798–1887), American Episcopal bishop of Mississippi
William Mercer Green (grandson) (1876–1942), American Episcopal bishop of Mississippi
Will S. Green (1832–1905), California pioneer

See also
William Greene (disambiguation)
Bill Green (disambiguation) for those known as Bill or Billy
Will Green (disambiguation)
Willie Green (disambiguation)